Umivik is an abandoned settlement at Ammassalik Fjord. As of the winter of 1884–5, 19 Inuit lived there in a single dwelling.

See also
 Ammassalik wooden maps, made by a man named Kunit from Umivik

References

Further reading
 

Former populated places in Greenland